The Box Social were a band often described as pop rock, and sometimes as a grunge revival. Critics have compared their sound to Smashing Pumpkins, Franz Ferdinand and Lou Reed, with some songs compared positively to AC/DC and others negatively to Weezer. Critics praised Nick Woods' vocals, noting that he actually sings rather than screaming, and comparing his vocals to Jack White. Woods now plays in Direct Hit.

Members

Discography

References

External links
 MySpace Page

Rock music groups from Wisconsin
Alternative rock groups from Wisconsin